Zhi-Xun Shen (born July 1962) is a Chinese-American experimental and solid state physicist who is a professor at Stanford University. He is particularly noted for his ARPES studies on high-temperature superconductors.

Life
Shen was born in July 1962 in Zhejiang, China. He graduated from Fudan University with a B.S. in 1983, and went to the United States through the CUSPEA program organized by T. D. Lee. He earned his M.S. degree in 1985 at Rutgers University. In 1989 he received a PhD in applied physics from Stanford University. In 1991 he became assistant professor, in 1996 associate professor, and in 2000 full professor at Stanford University. Since 2010 he is chief scientist at SLAC (at the Stanford Synchrotron Radiation Lightsource, SSRL), and since 2006 he is founding director of the Stanford Institute for Materials and Energy Sciences (SIMES). Furthermore, 2005 to 2008 he was director of the Geballe Laboratory for Advance Materials.

Research
He developed several precision instruments, e.g. for synchrotron radiation sources, helium lamps for UV and angle-resolved photoemission spectroscopy (ARPES), and he used these to study high-temperature superconductors. For example, his group in 2010 obtained convincing evidence that the pseudogap phase of the cuprate high-temperature superconductors, which was discovered in the mid 1990s, indeed is an independent phase (independent from the metallic and superconducting phases), which reaches into the superconducting phase. Besides ARPES techniques in the UV regime, he also employs x-ray diffraction methods.

He developed near-field microwave microscopy (scanning microwave impedance microscopy) based on atomic force microscopes for studies on mesoscopic length scales, e.g. nanostructured materials. Using this, he addresses applications such as new techniques for solar collectors (Photo Enhanced Thermionic Emission, PETE).

Awards
In 1999 he gave the APS Centennial lecture and in 2003 was elected fellow of the American Physical Society (APS), In 2000 he received the Kamerlingh Onnes Prize and in 2009 the Ernest Orlando Lawrence Award, and 2011 together with Peter Johnson the Oliver E. Buckley Condensed Matter Prize. In 2015 he was elected to the National Academy of Sciences.  In 2017, Shen was elected as a foreign member of the Chinese Academy of Sciences.

References

External links 
 Homepage in Stanford
 Oliver Buckley Prize
 Further Homepage of Shen

1962 births
Living people
20th-century American physicists
21st-century American physicists
Chinese emigrants to the United States
Foreign members of the Chinese Academy of Sciences
Fudan University alumni
Members of the United States National Academy of Sciences
Educators from Wenzhou
Experimental physicists
Physicists from Zhejiang
Rutgers University alumni
Scientists from Wenzhou
Stanford University alumni
Stanford University faculty
Fellows of the American Physical Society
Oliver E. Buckley Condensed Matter Prize winners